= Princes Park Touch =

Princes Park Touch (PPT) is a sports organization which currently runs the largest touch football competition in Victoria. It was established in 2014 by Peter Shaw.

PPT runs mid-week social competition for approximately 60 teams playing over summer in both mixed, men's, and women's competition, and around 20 over winter playing mixed competition. In summer the competitions are run on Wednesday and Thursday nights and are based in the inner Melbourne suburb of Carlton. In winter 2022 all games will be played on Wednesday nights in Royal Park North in Parkville. Historically the winter competitions were based at JJ Holland Park, Kensington.

PPT also has a representative arms, and both women's and juniors training programs. All regular participants are members making PPT one of the biggest sporting organisations in Victoria based on playing membership.
